is a Japanese television drama series that aired on TBS in 1983.

Cast
 Masakazu Tamura as Mitsuo Kurahashi 
 Yoshio Harada as Daisuke Mizushima 
 Yūko Natori as Yoko Asami
 Michiyo Azusa as Sanae Aoyama
 Jun Miho as Mitsu
 Hisako Manda as Ritsuko Kaga
 Masahiko Tsugawa as Hideki Kamisaka

References

1983 Japanese television series debuts
1983 Japanese television series endings
TBS Television (Japan) dramas